HMS Penylan was a  destroyer of the Royal Navy. She was a member of the third subgroup of the class, and saw service in the Second World War, before being sunk by German E-boats in 1942.

Construction and commissioning
Penylan was ordered on 23 August 1940 under the 1940 War Emergency Programme from Vickers-Armstrongs, Barrow-in-Furness. She was laid down as Job No J3585 on 4 June 1941  and launched on 17 March 1942. She was commissioned into service on 25 August 1942, and after working up, was assigned to the 1st Destroyer Flotilla.  She was adopted by the civil community of the Borough and Rural District of Carmarthen as part of Warship Week during 1942.

Service
Penylan sailed to Scapa Flow in September and spent the rest of the month working up with ships of the Home Fleet, after which she sailed to Portsmouth.  She had to put into a commercial shipyard in London on 22 October after a number of defects came to light.  She was under repair until 9 November when she sailed to Portsmouth and joined the 1st Destroyer Flotilla on patrol in the English Channel.  She was deployed on 1 December to escort convoy PW-257. The convoy was attacked by E-boats on 3 December, and Penylan was torpedoed and sunk five miles south of Start Point by the E-boat S115.  Five officers and 112 ratings were rescued.  She was the shortest lived of the Hunts, spending only 30 days on active service.  The wreck is designated as a protected place under the Protection of Military Remains Act 1986.

References

Publications
 
 English, John (1987). The Hunts: a history of the design, development and careers of the 86 destroyers of this class built for the Royal and Allied Navies during World War II. England: World Ship Society. .

External sources
HMS Penylan's wartime career
Penylan at Uboat.net
SI 2008/0950 Designation under the Protection of Military Remains Act 1986

 

Hunt-class destroyers of the Royal Navy
Ships built in Barrow-in-Furness
1942 ships
World War II destroyers of the United Kingdom
Protected Wrecks of the United Kingdom
World War II shipwrecks in the English Channel
Maritime incidents in December 1942